Paola Tiziana Cruciani (born 29 May 1958) is an Italian actress, comedian and playwright.

Life and career 
Born in Rome, Cruciani studied acting at the "Laboratorio Teatrale", a theatre workshop directed by Gigi Proietti, graduating in 1981. Between 1981 and 1984 she was a member of the comedy ensemble "La Zavorra", with whom she took part in several television variety shows.

In 1984, Cruciani began working on stage as a playwright, actress and director, and in the same year made her film debut in Francesco Laudadio's Fatto su misura. She was married for several years to  film director Paolo Virzì, with whom she had a daughter, Ottavia.

In 1999, she was nominated for a David di Donatello for Best Supporting Actress thanks to her performance in Virzì's Baci e abbracci.

In 2020, she acted as Alberto Sordi's mother in the TV film Permette? Alberto Sordi.

References

External links 
 

1958 births
Living people
Italian film actresses
Italian television actresses
Italian stage actresses
Writers from Rome
Italian comedians
20th-century Italian dramatists and playwrights
21st-century Italian dramatists and playwrights
Italian women dramatists and playwrights